Frank Gerald Singlehurst Brewin (October 21, 1909 – April 21, 1976) was an Indian field hockey player who competed in the 1932 Summer Olympics.

In 1932 he was a member of the Indian field hockey team, which won the gold medal. He played one match as back and scored one goal.

He was born in Poona, India.

External links
 
 Profile

1909 births
1976 deaths
Field hockey players from Pune
Olympic field hockey players of India
Field hockey players at the 1932 Summer Olympics
Indian male field hockey players
Anglo-Indian people
Olympic gold medalists for India
Olympic medalists in field hockey
Medalists at the 1932 Summer Olympics
British India emigrants to the United Kingdom
British people of Anglo-Indian descent